The Geospatial Data Abstraction Library (GDAL) is a computer software library for reading and writing raster and vector geospatial data formats (e.g. shapefile), and is released under the permissive X/MIT style free software license by the Open Source Geospatial Foundation. As a library, it presents a single abstract data model to the calling application for all supported formats. It may also be built with a variety of useful command line interface utilities for data translation and processing. Projections and transformations are supported by the PROJ library.

The related OGR library (OGR Simple Features Library), which is part of the GDAL source tree, provides a similar ability for simple features vector graphics data.

GDAL was developed mainly by Frank Warmerdam until the release of version 1.3.2, when maintenance was officially transferred to the GDAL/OGR Project Management Committee under the Open Source Geospatial Foundation.

GDAL/OGR is considered a major free software project for its "extensive capabilities of data exchange" and also in the commercial GIS community due to its widespread use and comprehensive set of functionalities.

Software using GDAL/OGR
Several software programs use the GDAL/OGR libraries to allow them to read and write multiple GIS formats. Such programs include:
ArcGIS – Uses GDAL for custom raster formats
Avenza MAPublisher - GIS and mapping tools for Adobe Illustrator. Uses GDAL for coordinate system transformation, format reading & writing, geometry operations, & unit conversion.
Avenza Geographic Imager - Spatial imaging tools for Adobe Photoshop. Uses GDAL for coordinate system transformation, format reading & writing, & unit conversion.
Avenza Maps - iOS & Android mobile mapping application. Uses GDAL to read metadata information for geospatial maps / data to transform them to WGS84 for offline navigation.
Biosphere3D – Open source landscape scenery globe
Biotop Invent
Cadwork
ENVI – Remote Sensing software
ERDAS APOLLO - Image Server and remote sensing geo-services 
ERDAS GeoCompressor - Image compression to ECW and JP2 formats  
Geoconcept integrated GDAL in its 7.1 release
FWTools – A cross-platform open source GIS software bundle compiled by Frank Warmerdam
gdaltokmz – A Python module translating from GDAL-supported raster graphics formats to the Google Earth KMZ format
GeoDjango – Django's support for GIS-enabled databases
GeoDMS - A framework for building spatial calculation models.
GeoView Pro – iOS mobile mapping application 
Google Earth – A virtual globe and world imaging program
GRASS GIS
gvSIG
JMap
MangoMap
MapServer
MS4W - MapServer for Windows, a widely popular installer for the MapServer community, using GDAL for data access.
MapWindow GIS - Open Source C++ based geographic information system, ActiveX Control, and application programmer interface
Merkaartor
 NASA Ames Stereo Pipeline, an open-source software package for photogrammetry
World Wind Java – NASA's open source virtual globe and world imaging technology
Open Source Geospatial Foundation (OSSIM) – Libraries and applications used to process imagery, maps, terrain, and vector data
OpenEV – Geospatial toolkit and a frontend to that toolkit; to display georeferenced images and elevation data
Orfeo toolbox – A satellite image processing library
QGIS
R – An open source statistical software with extensions for spatial data analysis.
SAGA GIS – A cross-platform open source GIS software
TopoQuest – Internet topographic map viewer
Rolta Geomatica software

Supported raster data formats
As of version 2.2.3, GDAL/OGR provides at least partial support for 154 raster and 93 vector geospatial data formats. A subset of data formats is supported to ensure the ability to directly create files and georeferencing them with the default GDAL compiling options.

Here follows the list of data formats whose support is, by default, compiled to allow creation and georeferencing.

Supported vector data formats

GDAL supports a variety of vector data formats as seen here. It is extensible as well.

References

Notes

External links

OSGeo project homepage

C++ libraries
Cross-platform software
Data structures libraries and frameworks
Free computer libraries
Free GIS software
GIS file formats
Software using the MIT license